The leader of the House of Commons is a minister of the Crown of the Government of the United Kingdom whose main role is organising government business in the House of Commons. The leader is generally a member or attendee of the cabinet of the United Kingdom.

The House of Commons devotes approximately three-quarters of its time to debating and explaining government business, such as bills introduced by the government and ministerial statements. The leader of the House of Commons, with the parties' chief whips ("the usual channels"), is responsible for organising government business and providing time for non-government (backbench) business to be put before the House of Commons.

The present leader of the House of Commons is Penny Mordaunt.

Responsibilities 
The current responsibilities of the leader of the House of Commons are as follows:

Planning and supervising the Government’s Legislative Programme;
Chairing the Cabinet Committee on Parliamentary Business and Legislation;
Managing the business of the House of Commons and preparing weekly statements on upcoming business;
Facilitating motions and debate in the Chamber;
Serving as the Government’s representative in the House, namely as a voting member of the House of Commons Commission, the Public Accounts Commission, the Members Estimate Committee, and the Speaker's Committee for the Independent Parliamentary Standards Authority;
Reforming parliamentary procedure and operations;
Representing the House of Commins within Government, be it contributing to the Civil Service’s efforts to build parliamentary capability or receiving MPs' requests for assistance on ministerial correspondence and questions; and
Ministerial responsibility for the Privy Council Office.

The Osmotherly Rules, which set out guidance on how civil servants should respond to parliamentary select committees, are jointly updated by the Office of the Leader of the House of Commons and the Cabinet Office.

History 

The title was not established until about the middle of the nineteenth century, although the institution is much older.

Until 1942, the title was usually held by the prime minister if he sat in the House of Commons, however, in more recent years, the title has been held by a separate politician.

The title holder is not formally appointed by the Crown and the title alone does not attract a salary, so is now usually held in addition to a sinecure, currently Lord President of the Council.

List of leaders of the House of Commons (1721–present)

Deputy Leader of the House of Commons 
From 1922, when the prime minister was also leader of the House of Commons, day-to-day duties were frequently carried out by a Deputy Leader of the House of Commons. At other times, a deputy leader of the House of Commons was appointed merely to enhance an individual politician's standing within the government.

The title has been in use since 1942, but was not used from the 2019 dissolution of the Second May ministry to 2022, when it was revived by Boris Johnson. This was shortlived however, as it was abolished by Liz Truss after she became Prime Minister a few months later.

List of Deputy Leaders of the House of Commons

See also
Leader of the House of Lords
Speaker of the House of Commons
Minister for Parliamentary Business, the equivalent cabinet post in the Scottish Government

References

External links
Official website
Deputy Leader of the House of Commons
Parliamentary website

Commons
Government of the United Kingdom
Ministerial offices in the United Kingdom
1721 establishments in Great Britain